Carmen Sandiego is an animated action-adventure television series with educational elements, based on the media franchise of the same name created by Broderbund. The series is produced by Houghton Mifflin Harcourt with WildBrain serving as the production company, and contains a "serialized look at Carmen's backstory that is told from her perspective". Serving as an origin story for the fictional thieving villain of the same name, it is the fourth Carmen Sandiego television show after the PBS game shows Where in the World is Carmen Sandiego? and Where in Time is Carmen Sandiego?, and the Fox animated series Where on Earth is Carmen Sandiego?; it is also the first Carmen Sandiego related show since the end of Where on Earth is Carmen Sandiego in 1999.

Serving as WildBrain's second reboot of an animated DIC Entertainment series, the series sees many characters drawn from the franchise's 35-year history: Carmen Sandiego herself who debuted in the original World video game; The Chief who took her current form in the World game show; Player, Zack, and Ivy who were featured in the Earth animated series, Chase Devineaux who debuted in Word Detective, and Julia Argent who was featured in Treasures of Knowledge.

The first season was released on January 18, 2019, on Netflix. A second season was released on October 1, 2019. A third season announced on April 24, 2020 and was released on October 1. A fourth and final season was announced on October 2, 2020, and was released on January 15, 2021.

Premise
An orphan girl codenamed Black Sheep was found on the side of a road in Buenos Aires, Argentina roughly 20 years ago and is raised and trained to become a master thief by a group of villains who double as the faculty at V.I.L.E. Academy, a school for thieves and secret criminal underworld organization, located on the Isle of V.I.L.E. in the Canary Islands. Black Sheep considers the island and faculty her home and family until she learns the organization's true nature. After seeing how much harm V.I.L.E causes, she goes rogue, escapes the island and adopts the name Carmen Sandiego. Now, she seeks to take down V.I.L.E. by stealing things they have already stolen, returning them to their rightful place or owner and stopping their future heists and plans from being executed. Carmen's friends and team are white-hat hacker Player, who works as recon tech support, and Boston siblings Zack and Ivy, who help her on-site and often act as distractions or operate the various get-away vehicles. She treats each one of them with care and together, they set out to thwart V.I.L.E.'s criminal schemes all while on the run from the mysterious secret government agency, A.C.M.E., who have set their sights on arresting V.I.L.E and Carmen.

A recurring theme is that both V.I.L.E. and A.C.M.E. make mistaken assumptions about Carmen's actions and intentions.

In season one, Carmen is a modern-day Robin Hood, traveling the globe, stealing from V.I.L.E. and giving back to its victims. Cloaked in red, she is accompanied by her hacker Player, and her best friends Zack and Ivy. Carmen is publicly perceived as a master criminal by most law enforcement agencies due to the sheer scale and theatricality of her heists. We follow her escapades and learn why she became a super thief and get to determine not only where, but “who” in the world is Carmen Sandiego?.

In season two, Carmen seeks answers about her past, while V.I.L.E. attempts to keep their finances from plummeting even further into the red. The Faculty attempt to find a new fifth member after Shadowsan joins Carmen. Thanks to Julia's encouragement, Carmen and the Chief make a loose alliance to take down V.I.L.E.

In season three, Carmen has been off the grid for months, looking for clues to her mother's identity. Julia quits A.C.M.E., after Chief has become too blinded by distrust toward Carmen, for stealing intel on her father from them, to see that she isn't stealing from anyone. V.I.L.E. sets up base in Scotland, sending new agents after Carmen who were specifically trained to capture her.

In season four, after several failed attempts to claim gold, including the lost hidden treasures stolen by the past generations of the organization, V.I.L.E. has been pushed to its limits and they start using robot operatives. They eventually capture and brainwash Carmen, who then quickly rebuilds their funds and gains the Faculty's favor. However, Graham helps A.C.M.E. bring the real Carmen back while selling out V.I.L.E. in the process. Carmen finally tracks down and meets her mother. Shadowsan retires, while Zack and Ivy join A.C.M.E. in crime-fighting. After the downfall of V.I.L.E., A.C.M.E. chases down its remaining members, with the occasional help from Carmen.

Characters

Main
 Carmen Sandiego / "Black Sheep" (voiced by Gina Rodriguez) – The eponymous protagonist and heroine seeking to dissolve V.I.L.E. and donate their stolen funds to humanitarian causes (the proceeds go through Carmen's charity Black Sheep Inc, as a subtle taunt to V.I.L.E.); this Carmen is notably different than previous incarnations, who were leaders of V.I.L.E. and lady thieves. The story she knew was that she was found as an abandoned baby on the roadside of Buenos Aires, Argentina 20 years ago. At a young age, she used to be a student at V.I.L.E. Academy until she left when she didn't want to take the life of anyone who gets in her way after stowing away on a mission and seeing what really goes on in V.I.L.E. She takes her name from the brand name tag in the hat she used in her escape disguise (which she stole from V.I.L.E. accountant; Cookie Booker). She is also nicknamed "Carm" by Zack & Ivy and "Red" by Player. By the end of the second season, Carmen learns of her true heritage as the daughter of former V.I.L.E. Faculty Member Dexter Wolfe, who was killed by the mysterious Chief of A.C.M.E. during an ambush by Interpol and assassination attempt by V.I.L.E. and that her mother may still be alive, thus making it her new secondary objective to find her mother.
 Player (voiced by Finn Wolfhard) – A white-hat hacker from Niagara Falls, Ontario who helps Carmen plan her heists, gives her intel about the places she visits and keeps her updated on the local authorities, V.I.L.E. activity, or any possibilities she may have missed. Player is inspired by the live-action character of the same name from Where on Earth Is Carmen Sandiego?, who in turn is a reference to people playing the video games—this version, however, has met Carmen physically, having met her in person for the first time during season 4. He is Carmen's best friend and with whom she has a close relationship and has been in contact with her since her school days on the isle. He cares for Carmen as a friend and helps Shadowsan uncover The Chief's identity. In Season 4, his last name is revealed to be Bouchard.
 Zack (voiced by Michael Hawley) and Ivy (voiced by Abby Trott) –  Siblings from South Boston helping Carmen after they met during a Donut shop heist which was a V.I.L.E. front; they are inspired by the A.C.M.E. detectives of the same names from Where on Earth Is Carmen Sandiego?, voiced by Scott Menville and Jennifer Hale respectively. Ivy, the older of the two, often runs interference for Carmen, either through disguises or her engineering skills; she also is much more well-read than Zack, who habitually makes mistakes about their discoveries and is less experienced with going undercover (almost giving himself away when tricking the Countess), hence why he more often serves as Carmen's wheelman/getaway driver.
 Shadowsan / Suhara (voiced by Paul Nakauchi; main – season 2) – A Japanese master thief, skilled swordsman, assassin, and a former member of the V.I.L.E. Faculty teaching stealth and covert thievery. He gave a test where students had to find and steal a dollar from his coat when Carmen was still in school and emptied his coat so she wouldn't be able to find the dollar, which caused Carmen's need to outdo Tigress. In the season one finale, Shadowsan revealed that he was really on Carmen's side all her life and that he was the one who found her in Argentina when she was a baby. He emptied his coat in order to protect her from joining V.I.L.E. He is a secret member of Carmen's team as well, providing her with a new drive on V.I.L.E.'s financial data at the end of the season. By season 2, his betrayal is revealed and he becomes an enemy of V.I.L.E. while helping Carmen foil their plans. In "The Daisho Caper", his real name is revealed to be Suhara, having stolen his katana from his brother decades earlier and regretting the life he chose. In the season 2 finale, he reveals to Carmen that he was sent to kill her father Dexter Wolfe, a.k.a. The Wolf, a V.I.L.E. Faculty member, but witnessed his death by Tamara Fraser who then became Chief of A.C.M.E. He joins Carmen's search to find her mother, who went into hiding just before Wolfe's death. While he's not stated it, Shadowsan sees Carmen's team as family. In the 1994 animated series, Suhara was the name of a great Japanese detective who mentored Carmen when she was an A.C.M.E. agent.

A.C.M.E.
A.C.M.E. (short for Agency to Classify & Monitor Evildoers) is the secret law enforcement agency that often combats V.I.L.E. and the anti-heroes of the series.  In this iteration, they seek out finding proof leading to the dissolution of the criminal organization through the means of finding and capturing Carmen and her crew for intel on them.

 The Chief / Tamara Fraser (voiced by Dawnn Lewis) – Head of A.C.M.E. and supervises all of the organization; she is inspired by the Chief from the PBS game shows, played by  Lynne Thigpen. She has only appeared via hologram in most of the series but believes Carmen may be a lead to helping A.C.M.E. prove the existence and downfall of V.I.L.E. By the end of season 2, it is revealed that her name is Tamara Fraser and that she was the one who killed Carmen's father, Dexter Wolfe, the night she was taken in by Shadowsan; it's possible that due to her error in judgment that caused Wolfe's death, The Chief does not tolerate incompetence and issues agents with capture only gear, despite her own assumptions about and eventually mistaken obsession with Carmen. The Chief has also been obsessed in her pursuit of finding evidence on V.I.L.E.'s existence ever since killing Wolfe, for unknown motivations.
 Chase Devineaux (voiced by Rafael Petardi) – A French Interpol inspector turned A.C.M.E. recruit; he is inspired by the A.C.M.E. agent of the same name from Carmen Sandiego Word Detective. He, along with Julia, is one of the only two agents to get close enough to see Carmen's face. He is inept, arrogant, pompous, and constantly overestimating his own abilities. By the end of the first season, Chase is put into mental strain caused by a device Brunt and Shadowsan used to force him to answer their questions. In season 2, after waking up from his coma, he provides a lead but is dismissed and returned to Interpol with a desk job, only to be fired for going off the grid in pursuit of Carmen and finds the Isle of V.I.L.E. only after it was destroyed. By the season 2 finale, A.C.M.E. rehires him after Carmen steals from their databanks and eventually gains a higher opinion of him after his success in preventing 'Carmen' from stealing priceless masks. At the end of Season 3, Chase realized Julia was right about Carmen; he decides to help her stop V.I.L.E. subtly.
 Julia Argent (voiced by Charlet Chung) – An Interpol agent turned A.C.M.E. recruit, Chase's partner and opposite: she usually does the logistics and fact-finding that Chase would otherwise overlook or disregard; is more highly intelligent, competent and perceptive; and is the most open to believing Carmen is instead stealing from other thieves (which is even given the option of exploitation in the interactive special To Steal or Not to Steal). She is inspired by the A.C.M.E. detective of the same name from Where in the World Is Carmen Sandiego? Treasures of Knowledge. In season 2, Julia actively tries to recruit Carmen as an A.C.M.E. agent despite being undermined by the Chief's focus to outright arrest Carmen to gain intel on V.I.L.E. She, along with Chase Devineaux, is one of the only two officers to get close enough to see Carmen's face. She is also the only A.C.M.E. agent to visibly keep her job for the whole of both seasons until season 3, when she quit due to the Chief's mistaken assumptions with Carmen.
 Zari (voiced by Sharon Muthu; main – season 2) – A longtime pursuant of Carmen Sandiego's, who becomes Argent's partner in season 2. While focused and efficient, her loyalty is shown to lie with the Chief and not her partner, as seen in Stockholm when her team swarmed Carmen in talks with Argent to secure loyalty after Zari realized she was following a decoy (Ivy). She is later partnered with Devineaux in season 3.

V.I.L.E.
V.I.L.E. (short for Villains' International League of Evil) is a shadowy international criminal organization of thieves and the main antagonists of the series. Its undercover name is Valuable Imports, Lavish Exports. They make their headquarters on one of the Canary Islands and use the academy there to train their new recruits for a one-year semester. As of the end of Season 2, V.I.L.E. Island was destroyed after the V.I.L.E. Faculty believed that A.C.M.E. had found their location. V.I.L.E. was then relocated to a castle in Scotland in Season 3.

The Faculty
A council of five masterminds who are the leaders of V.I.L.E., the instructors of V.I.L.E. Academy, and the primary antagonists of the series who Carmen considered the only family she knew before betraying them. They each have equal authority, and reach decisions by a majority vote; thus they try to ensure an odd number is always present.

 Professor Gunnar Maelstrom (voiced by Liam O'Brien) – A Swedish-Norwegian psychiatrist and teacher of psychological manipulation. Sinister and quite psychotic, often the classic Machiavellian type villain and coming off as creepy to the V.I.L.E. graduates and faculty. He also likes classical music, as shown in the Season 4 episode, "The Himalayan Rescue Caper", when he enthusiastically waves around like a conductor to a piece of classical music. Unlike his 1994 series counterpart, he is part of V.I.L.E. itself, often acting as the leader, mediator, and head spokesperson for the faculty as a group.
 Coach Brunt (voiced by Mary Elizabeth McGlynn) – A Texan coach and teacher of combat and physical training. She was Carmen's favorite teacher, and the two had soft spots for each other. Carmen always thought that Coach Brunt was the one who found her, so the two shared a good relationship. Brunt, like the other faculty members, was quite upset over Carmen's betrayal. However, it seems that Carmen still has a soft spot for Coach Brunt, despite her true motivations. This was thought when Carmen gets altitude sickness and mistakes Dr. Pilar as Coach Brunt, saying that she always knew it was Coach Brunt who found her as a baby (however, that honor is revealed to go to Shadowsan). Brunt takes any betrayal of V.I.L.E. personally as she sees them as family. She sports green hair, a possible nod to Eartha Brute from the World game show.
 Countess Cleo (voiced by Toks Olagundoye) – An Egyptian wealthy debutant and teacher of culture, class, and forgery, possibly a reference to the Contessa, a recurring villain from the World gameshow. She seems to not really care that much about Carmen, and always tries to use her etiquette lessons to get rid of Carmen's rebellious streak. Her crimes deal with obtaining fine art and fashion which she keeps for short periods before selling them off.
 Dr. Saira Bellum (voiced by Sharon Muthu) – An Indian mad scientist and V.I.L.E.'s master inventor; teacher of technology and science and much like her 1994 animated series counterpart, is the main technical expert, responsible for creating all of the many gadgets and tools V.I.L.E. uses in their heists and schemes. She is shown to be slightly more reasonable than the other faculty, though still willing to destroy the food supply of Indonesia just to shill in a market for an artificial commercial brand; she also has trouble understanding metaphors. She tends to multitask even during council meetings, focusing on numerous screens of information, much to Maelstrom's annoyance. It is shown on multiple occasions that she is a cat lover. Her name is a pun on the word cerebellum, a part of the brain, due to her intelligence.
 Roundabout / Nigel Braithwaite (voiced by Trevor Devall) – A senior V.I.L.E. operative and British MI6 double-agent who runs the agency and takes the place of Shadowsan at the end of season 2. He utilizes his influence in British Intelligence to give V.I.L.E. a leg up on any law enforcement that may zero in on their operations, as well as divert attention away with proper diversionary substance. Like his namesake, he speaks in the manner of one who received a prodigious education but also uses that vernacular to imply something without saying so and leading people into how he wants them. By the end of Season 3, he is revealed to be a talented fencer and was exposed to the rest of the world as a criminal for stealing the Crown Jewels thanks to Player by uploading a video of him stealing them. He was arrested, but the Cleaners rescued him. However, by season 4, he is given a second chance along with Neal, but failed in "The Beijing Bullion Caper" and was thrown in the dungeon for the rest of the season while Neal escaped and by the end of season 4, he was arrested along with rest of the Faculty.

V.I.L.E. Operatives
 Tigress / Sheena (voiced by Kari Wahlgren) – A spy with a literal catsuit and mask to match her namesake, who is particularly antagonistic toward Carmen, even while at the academy. She is based on the character of the same name from the original 1994 animated series; though, unlike the original, who was nothing more than a disguise donned by Ivy, Tigress is a separate person in the 2019 continuum. She is the longest-running combatant against Carmen, who felt like she needed to prove she was better than Tigress at pick-pocketing due to Tigress acing a test set by Shadowsan that Carmen failed (however, this is only because Shadowsan cheated so Carmen could fail). Tigress also dislikes Paper Star. In the interactive special, it is shown that in spite of her dislike of Carmen, Tigress is still capable of returning the favor if Carmen helps her out, showing that she has a sense of honor.
 El Topo / Antonio (voiced by Andrew Pifko) and Le Chevre / Jean Paul (voiced by Bernardo de Paula) – A pair of V.I.L.E. operatives who used to be in Carmen's group of friends before she left. El Topo is a wisecracking Spanish spy with streamlined powerful digging gauntlets, while Le Chevre is a no-nonsense French spy with incredible parkour skills. In the interactive special, if Carmen works with El Topo, he holds no hostility towards her, stating his belief they are just pawns in the game of life; Le Chevre, on the other hand, will taunt her. With the destruction of V.I.L.E. at the end of season 4, they open a food truck together.
 Paper Star (voiced by Kimiko Glenn) – A psychopathic master of origami weapons, she is Maelstrom's favorite pupil. In contrast, Shadowsan rightfully believes Paper Star to be too psychotic to carry out orders, as Paper Star refused to hand over the stolen goods to Le Chevre per V.I.L.E. protocol. Paper Star has little combat experience outside of her origami techniques; whenever they have been negated, Carmen has gained the upper hand.
 Mime Bomb – A silent mute, spy and snitch; dresses as a mime artist for public camouflage. He is usually used by the faculty to spy on the students, which is also how the faculty found out that Carmen had stowed away. However, they sometimes wonder if it was a good idea to hire a mime as a spy since they can't really understand what he's trying to say though he does communicate through charades or sign language.
  The Cleaners / Vlad and Boris   (voiced by Liam O'Brien) – Two men who not just have janitorial duties as the cleaning crew at V.I.L.E. but they are also the men-in-black who are deployed to extricate V.I.L.E. members who have failed their missions by being apprehended and "Scrub" any evidence of V.I.L.E.'s existence. The duo rarely speaks but are diligent in their jobs. They work quickly, quietly, and without complaint. As Shadowsan notes, they are without fear. Vlad is shorter than Boris and has brown hair and eyebrows with a sharper chin than him. He possesses a more tired expression as well. His hair is revealed to be balding. Boris's chin is more square and blunt than Vlad's and is taller than him. His hair and eyebrows are black and tilted. They both have somewhat wrinkly faces with their hair cut short. Their attire changes depending on their part in missions but they mainly wear pale green-grey shirts and pants with a black belt. During a costume party in the episode "The Haunted Bayou Caper", Boris dresses as Frankenstein, and Vlad as Count Dracula. They are based on Rick and Nick ICK, commonly known as The ICK Brothers, a pair of V.I.L.E. henchmen who had similar jobs, seen in the 1996 edition of Where in the World is Carmen Sandiego?, who were assigned to "clean up" the evidence of V.I.L.E.'s whereabouts. However, the brothers' incompetence always ends up creating more messes for V.I.L.E.'s members as ACME's detectives continue to pursue them.
 Cookie Booker (voiced by Rita Moreno) – V.I.L.E.'s bookkeeper and financier; she believes in white collar crime above other forms. Rita Moreno was the voice of Carmen Sandiego in the 1994 animated series, a connection subtly referenced when Carmen steals her trademark outfit from Booker as a kind of "passing of the torch."
 Dash Haber (voiced by Troy Baker) – Countess Cleo's executive courier and personal assistant. Dash Haber's main weapon is his hat, which is embellished with razor-sharp blades and can be thrown and retrieved through magnets in his gloves. His name is a pun of the word haberdasher.
 Lady Dokuso (voiced by Sumalee Montano) – a veteran V.I.L.E. operative who is a prominent poison expert stationed in Tokyo, where she runs a nightclub frequented by Yakuza and noted to be a woman of great skill. She has excellent reflexes, having been able to effectively repel an attack from Paper Star using only an umbrella. She also displayed skillful acrobatics during fights with Shadowsan.
 Neal the Eel (voiced by Rhys Darby) – A New Zealand thief that wears a wet suit allowing him to slip through vents, tight spaces, and anyone that attempts to grab him. He mostly works for Dr. Bellum and rarely teams up with another agent. His offensive weapons are a pair of tasers.
 Spin Kick (voiced by Dante Basco) – A member of V.I.L.E. Academy's newest graduated class that specializes in kickboxing and partnered with Fly Trap. Carmen simply avoids him as they are too evenly matched.
 Fly Trap (voiced by Sarah-Nicole Robles) – A member of V.I.L.E. Academy's newest graduated class that wields a pair of bolas and partnered with Spin Kick. Carmen outwits her by using the bolas in ricochet attacks to catch Fly Trap off guard.
  The Troll (voiced by Osric Chau) – A Korean skilled computer tech and internet hacker who is like an evil counterpart to Player. Though it is unknown if The Troll is also a white-hat hacker, he has demonstrated as high proficiency in encryption breaking, hacking and data collection as Player. The Troll hates it when people call him simply "Troll", though he admits that it's not always best to pronounce it that way.

Former V.I.L.E. operatives
 Graham Calloway (voiced by Michael Goldsmith) – Also known as Gray or Crackle, Graham is an Australian electrician, an Ex-V.I.L.E. operative and Carmen's former best friend at V.I.L.E. Academy. However, after a failed mission, Graham had his memories erased by Bellum. He returned to Australia where he met up with Carmen once again (only this time, he didn't remember her) and asked her out on a date. However she left before she even got there, because she thought that Gray had a chance to start over, and that Carmen Sandiego would ruin that chance. In "The Crackle Goes Kiwi Caper", Carmen recruits him to help her infiltrate Dr. Bellum's New Zealand lab, but upon his realizing Carmen's true mission, he helps destroy Bellum's experiment; they then finally have that date and talk more. By the end of season 3, it is revealed that Graham has been spied on by A.C.M.E. since then, acknowledging that he is the last and only link they have to Carmen, and it is hinted they intend to bring him in.
 Dexter Wolfe / The Wolf – Carmen's late father and Shadowsan's predecessor as both a member of the V.I.L.E. Faculty and Stealth 101 Professor at V.I.L.E. Academy, he was a master thief who was often allowed to leave V.I.L.E. Island due to his expertise, though he preferred stealing for the thrill rather than for selfish gain. However, when Carmen was born, the rest of the faculty realized that he was planning to leave the organization and sent Shadowsan to assassinate him. By this point, he was attempting to make his escape with Baby Carmen to be reunited with his wife "Vera Cruz" but was accidentally killed instead by the current Chief of A.C.M.E. after hiding Carmen in the closet, leaving her to be taken to V.I.L.E. Island by Shadowsan.

Episodes

Series Overview

Season 1 (2019)

Season 2 (2019)

Special (2020)

Season 3 (2020)

Season 4 (2021)

Production
On April 14, 2017, Hollywood insider information site The Tracking Board reported that they had exclusively learned of an animated Carmen Sandiego project at Netflix, with Gina Rodriguez as the voice of the titular character. The site reported that the 20-episode series would aim to be "as educational as it is entertaining", in keeping with the style of the franchise. It was later confirmed that the series would be called Carmen Sandiego. Rodriguez confirmed the story via her Twitter feed the following day in response to a Hypable story, which compared the news to that of a Kate McKinnon-led revival of The Magic School Bus. Carmen Sandiego was set to appeal to a wider audience (ages 6–11), plus the parents of those kids and fans of the original series. On April 18 and 19, the news began to be published by reputable news sites, where it was confirmed that Netflix had rebooted the franchise on TV by ordering twenty 22-minute episodes of Carmen Sandiego, which would premiere in 2019 and with Gina Rodriguez in the starring role. Rotoscopers noted that this was "more than most Netflix Originals receive". The Hollywood Reporter noted that Rita Moreno, who voiced Carmen in the FOX animated series Where on Earth Is Carmen Sandiego?, had recently guest-starred on Rodriguez's show Jane the Virgin. The new series was described as having "thrilling adventure and intrigue", while offering an "intimate look into Carmen's past" and what inspired her career choices, essentially answering the question "Who in the world  is Carmen Sandiego?" while simultaneously following her on her thieving escapades.

Caroline Fraser, Head of HMH Productions, is the Executive Producer of the series. Duane Capizzi, known for Transformers: Prime and The Batman, is the showrunner and Co-Executive Producer. Kevin Dart serves as visual designer. It is a production by DHX Media, providing production work, and Chromosphere, providing the design work. Animation services are outsourced to Top Draw Animation in the Philippines. DHX Media is the current owner of the library of DIC Entertainment, the animation studio which produced the Earth animated series. The series is produced by Houghton Mifflin Harcourt, who own the rights to the franchise after their corporate predecessor Riverdeep acquired the property in 2002. The Hollywood Reporter wrote that the series followed in the wake of Bill Nye Saves the World and Julie's Greenroom. Finn Wolfhard signed on to lend his voice to the character Player, who is described as Carmen's chief accomplice and friend. Another character called "Player" was featured in Where on Earth Is Carmen Sandiego?, but this character was a fourth wall-breaking live action boy who bookended the show and interacted with Carmen, implied to be the player of a video game featuring her. E! Online reported that the new series would be called, simply, "Carmen Sandiego".

Rodriguez, who had first learned about the series through the PBS game show Where in the World Is Carmen Sandiego?, asserted that the new Carmen Sandiego origin series was "tight", "well written", "really, really good", and "unbelievable". She mentioned that Netflix was a home for great programming and that the show had partnered with talented illustrators. She added that despite being entertaining, the show would still provide geographic and historical education. In another interview, she said that she loved the art and story of the animated series, and praised the show's executive producer, Duane Capizzi, for making the world that Carmen inhabits in the show itself.

Andy Yeatman, Netflix director of global kids content, explained “We think there's a huge benefit of having a program that parents remember fondly and grew up with. We are giving them the opportunity to introduce it to their kids and spark a conversation", explaining that while the service pitched reboots of many '80s and '90s shows, Carmen Sandiego was one that "made sense" and "really stood out". They responded to the fact that this is not a show that is perennially rebooted, as the last Carmen Sandiego series ended 20 years before this new series would premiere, and that there are interesting ways to retell the story. In addition to Yeatman's comments, Amy Dunkin, Houghton Mifflin's the chief marketing officer, noted that many had "fond memories" of Carmen Sandiego, and added that there are many ways "you can go with Carmen just based on what she stands for."

In March 2018, Netflix also ordered a live-action film of Carmen Sandiego, once again with Rodriguez as the titular character.

Of the initial 20-episode order, nine episodes were released as the show's first season. On February 15, 2019, Netflix announced the second season, made up of a further ten.

On April 24, 2020, Netflix announced a third season, followed on October 2, 2020, with announcement of a fourth, which was later announced to be the final season.

In September and October 2021, the official Twitter account for the show confirmed that a spin-off of the series was in the "earliest stages" and that they would share details on the spinoff as soon as they could.

Syndication
After the end of the show, it has been syndicated across countries. In France, it airs on Disney Channel since August 29, 2022. In Switzerland, it airs on RTS 1 since August 27, 2022. In Japan, it also airs on Disney Channel. In Canada, it airs on Family Channel since 2023 and WildBrainTV since November 5, 2022.

Reception

Pre-release
The announcement saw a positive response by the media, who appreciated the throwback, and a return for the Carmen Sandiego franchise to the small screen. TVShowsOnDVD wrote "It's awesome to see this franchise return to television". The Rolling Stone thought the TV series' origin story subject matter offers what was once one of "golden age of television's favorite thematic trappings". Commenting "children of the 90's rejoice", Maxim suggested that Netflix enlist the talents of World game show theme song performers Rockapella to provide music for the show. ScreenRant noted that "those who still hold fond memories of the property" would be intrigued as to what type of shape the new series will take; adding that it has a "storied legacy" to live up to and will likely take some inspiration from Earth. Dark Horizons expressed sadness that the show was two years away. Toonzone wondered if the new show would maintain the established backstory of the red fedora-wearing villain, which in mid-to-late ‘90s canon involved Carmen Sandiego beginning as an A.C.M.E. agent before finding the work too easy so wanting to outsmart her former colleagues. Gizmodo thought the new series would "bring the character's trademark blend of edutainment to new audiences". Mashable said "fans demanding the series NOW". Pedestrian thought the trend toward series such as this was a sign that producers were aiming to " trap people in a downwards vortex of nostalgia ". Fortune suggested that the new show offered Netflix "huge merchandizing potential", and that the company could follow in the footsteps of Disney by creating a merchandising arm to support its shows. Rom-Game saw this as a sign that Netflix was "indirectly interested in gaming heritage". MiscRave mentioned how much potential the franchise with its interactive edutainment in a compelling package it previously had. NerdHQ noted that the new series offered an opportunity to resuscitate the "once-dormant" and "dying" franchise. Apart from these media reviews, various Latina women across the United States were excited and energized by the show's release.

Post-release
The show currently holds a 93% approval rating on Rotten Tomatoes, based on 14 reviews, with the site's consensus reading, "Vivid animation and creative reconstruction of the Carmen Sandiego backstory elevates this property beyond its edutainment roots." Other reviewers are more critical. Renaldo Matadeen of CBR, for instance, critically reviewed the series. He argued that the second season ended on a "very intense note," while noting the family history themes in the show, and stated that the final episode of the third season remixes all the movies of the Ocean's franchise. In a review of all the episodes of the third season, he wrote that there is a "lot packed in" the third season, predicting the revenge of the villainous Roundabout, saving Gray, a face-off between The Chief and Carmen, and the continued search for Carmen's mom in the show's next season.
At the same time, Martha Sorren of Bust also predicted that the fourth season could explore the relationship between Carmen and her mother.

Megan Summers of ScreenRant highlighted Wolfhard's role as Player, calling it one of his best roles, and Prabhdeep Dhaliwal in The Peak stated that while the show is "geared towards a younger demographic," adults can still be entertained by it. He also stated that the show has sympathetic characters and an "overarching theme of good winning over evil." Katherine Smith of Paste took a different tack. While stating that Carmen Sandiego has returned to relevance with the Netflix series, she also highlights how animated projects "hustle their employees out of sight," contrasting the gains in visible representation with "very plausible worker exploitation." She cites an example of Filipino company, Top Draw (working on the animation), which fired a whistleblower who demanded proper compensation. She concludes by saying that in the current series, Carmen Sandiego is a female thief who "steals only from thieves now," and worries about where her character has gone, compared to the original story. On the other hand, Emily Ashby of Common Sense Media described the series as "action-packed" and argued that the series "incorporates solid geographical and cultural information" into the story in "creative ways."

Awards and nominations

References

External links
 

2010s American animated television series
2020s American animated television series
2010s Canadian animated television series
2020s Canadian animated television series
2019 American television series debuts
2021 American television series endings
2019 Canadian television series debuts
2021 Canadian television series endings
2019 animated television series debuts
American children's animated action television series
American children's animated adventure television series
American children's animated education television series
American children's animated mystery television series
American flash animated television series
Animated detective television series
Animated series based on video games
Animated television series reboots
Annie Award winners
Canadian children's animated action television series
Canadian children's animated adventure television series
Canadian children's animated education television series
Canadian children's animated mystery television series
Canadian flash animated television series
Carmen Sandiego TV shows
English-language Netflix original programming
Television series by DHX Media
Animated television series by Netflix
Netflix children's programming